The cap of a crown is the cap which fills the inner space of a modern crown. While ancient crowns contained no cap, from mediaeval times it became traditional to fill the circlet with a cap of velvet or other such cloth, with a base of ermine.

While the precise reason for the inclusion of a cap is unknown, two reasons are often given:

 to add to the visual impact of the crown, while showing off the golden circlet to maximum effect;
 to keep a monarch's head warm in drafty mediaeval buildings during long coronation ceremonies or public events where crowns were worn.

Not all crowns contained cloth caps. Some caps were metallic and heavily jewelled.

Crowns (headgear)